The Duet free routine competition at the 2022 World Aquatics Championships was held on 21 and 23 June 2022.

Results
The preliminary round was started on 21 June at 09:00.
The final was started on 23 June at 16:00.

Green denotes finalists

References

Duet free routine